Waves is the annual cultural festival of BITS Pilani, K K Birla Goa Campus. It is a three-day-long festival held in the late October – early November period. It is a cultural festival that is held annually to celebrate music, dance and art. It is an inter college festival with students coming in to participate in events and competitions from across the country.

The first edition of Waves was in 2006. Events include Dance, Drama, Literature, Comedy, Fashion and Music. Elimination rounds to many of these events are held across various cities in India during the months before the festival.

The Professional Nights, often called "Nites" in the college lingo, are a major attraction, with every night in the three night festival dedicated to a different genre. Both Indian and International artists have performed in past editions.

History

Waves actually sees its roots in an intra-college festival organised in 2005. Waves as an inter-college festival was first organised in 2006, which was then a regional cultural festival in Goa. Many colleges from Goa and Mumbai participated in Waves in the subsequent years. In 2008 Waves entered the mainstream with a theme suiting the culture of Goa- "Nirvana". The following year 2009 saw two editions of this festival.  Waves 2014 saw an international act, The WorldFest, a Coke Studio performance for the Indie Nite as well as the Searock event which had become one of India's biggest semi-professional rock band hunt contests.

Celebrities like Farhan Akhtar, Amit Trivedi, Neeti Mohan, Vishal–Shekhar, Priyanka Chopra, Kalki Koechlin, Kailash Kher, Karsh Kale and musical acts like Nucleya, Ritviz, Quintino, Marnik, Lost Stories,  have performed at Waves. Comedy houses like All India Bakchod, TVF, Being Indian and others have also performed at Waves. Events like Sunburn and Femina Miss India eliminations have been hosted by Waves.

Waves celebrated its 10-year anniversary in the year 2016 from 4–6 November with the theme Waves 2016– "Tides of Time". The last theme of Waves 2019 was "En Voyage".

Events

Competitions
The events and competitions at Waves belong to a variety of cultural categories such as Music, Dance, Literary, Quiz, Drama, Fine Arts, Film, and many more. Here participants showcase their talents and win laurels for their respective colleges. Some of the competitions include Step-Up, Indian Rock, Jukebox, Contention, Moot Court, Nukkad Naatak, Word Games, JAM, "Sizzle" and "Vices Quiz". There are more than 40 competitions in total.[4]

The concept of mini-fests was initiated in 2017 edition of Waves. The competitions and events are grouped into four mini-fests.                                                                                                                            Florence, the performing arts festival.                                                                                                                                                                                                                                                                                               Beau Vista, the design festival.                                                                                                                                                                                                                                                                                                                                                                         Carpe Dictum, the literary arts festival.                                                                                                                                                                                                                                                                                                                        Specials, includes interesting line-up of Quiz, Film and Photography events.

Waves also hold elimination rounds of certain competitions outside the campus in various cities. The event "Show Me The Funny", where Stand-up Comedians from all over India compete, held its elimination rounds in various cities like Mumbai, Pune, Bangalore, Delhi and Hyderabad for Waves 2016.

Big 4

These are the biggest competitions in Waves, which attract the maximum crowd. Teams from various colleges all over India participate in these three events. The Big 3 events are:

1)   Natyanjali:

Natyanjali is the most popular competition in Waves. It is a group dance competition, including a variety of dance forms. The event is judged by people from dance and choreography academies in India.

2)   Mr. And Ms. Waves:

This event is the Talent Hunt event of Waves. Participants showcase their varied talents like music, dance, acting etc. Then in the next round they are asked questions to judge their overall personality and attitude.

In Waves 2019, this event was judged by Raghu Ram from the hit show MTV Roadies.

3)    FashP:

FashP or Fashion Parade is the Fashion event of Waves. Thematic ramp walks, new concepts and trends of fashion are showcased in this event. The event has been judged by fashion training academies like Femina in the past editions of Waves.

This event was judged by Meghna Kaur in the 2019 edition of Waves.

4)   SeaRock:

Tagline: Where Music breathes Life.

SeaRock is a national semi-professional band competition and is held in several cities, with eliminations in 12 cities including Mumbai, Delhi, Chennai, Bangalore and Goa. SeaRock also hosted Kathmandu , Nepal in 2018 for the first time as a part of its expansion process. The winners receive cash prizes, scholarships at the music academies and a feature in media publications. The top three bands also get to open for the headlining artists on Waves main stage.

Lex Omnia Moot Court 
A Moot Court Event by the name “Lex Omnia” is another speciality of Waves. Participants from various Law schools all over India participate in this event. In 2015, Waves organised this event in association with NALSAR, Hyderabad, one of India's leading law school.

Specials
The Specials at Waves encompass a variety of unconventional events and competitions. Previous editions have included paintball, blackjack, poker, donut eating competition, Limca Book of Records attempt, Guinness World Record attempt, Housie, All Night Treasure Hunt and Last Entrepreneur standing, Wallstreet fete, Ratatouille etc.

Creative works

Waves Ball

BITS Goa hosts The Waves Ball, to which couples from all participant colleges are invited. The highlights of the Ball include the elaborate cuisine, a live-band, and a number of couple events and games.

Waves Ball at Waves 2015 had a theme "A Midnight in Paris".
Workshops

Waves hosts a number of workshops, including Belly Dancing, Origami, Skate-Boarding, Beat-boxing, Canvas shoe Painting, Latin dance, Pottery etc. Besides the on-fest workshops, Waves organizes a pre-fest Dance Workshop a month before the fest.

Adventure zone

Waves also organizes adventure events during the three days. Previous editions of Waves had events like Zorb Soccer, Laser tag, Paintball, Bungee Run, Slip soccer and Sumo Wrestling.

Professional Nites
Waves gained popularity far and wide due to the euphoria and ecstasy it creates in its Professional Nights or Pro-Nites as they are called. Popular national as well as international artists perform every year at Pro Nites. Waves has previously featured the likes of Vishal–Shekhar, Priyanka Chopra, Karsh Kale, Blackstratblues, Kailash Kher, [5] Shafqat Amanat Ali, Shankar Mahadevan, Strings, Indian Ocean, Parikrama (band), Thermal and a Quarter,[6] Pakistani Rock act Raeth (band), Carnatic Rock band Agam (band), Dead Letter Circus, Candice Redding, DJ NYK, DJ Suketu etc.

The Pro-Nites of Waves are divided into 3 Nites, to cater to varied tastes of the audience:

EDM Nite

The EDM Nite is usually held on the last night during which an Electronic musician performs. Previous editions of Waves have seen performances by renowned electronic music artists like Tony Junior, Nucleya, Quintino, Marnik, Diego Miranda, Ritviz, etc. This is the biggest musical act of the whole fest and draws the largest crowd.

EDM Nite also hosted an official Pre-Sunburn event in previous editions of Waves.

There are usually two to three acts on EDM night, with the opening acts performing initially followed by the main artist.

Indie Nite

Indie Nitefeatures performances by Indie Music Artists. In the past the Indie Nite has seen performances by The Local Train, Dead Letter Circus, Blackstratblues, Anand Bhaskar Collective, The Yellow Diary,
Indian Ocean and Sifar.

Bollywood Nite

Bollywood Nite has performances by Bollywood actors such as Amit Trivedi, Jonita Gandhi Vishal–Shekhar, Kailash Kher, Salim–Sulaiman and Farhan Akhtar.

Waves 2019 
Tagline: En Voyage!

The festival is to be held from the 1–3 November, though national eliminations of different events such as SeaRock, Irshaad, Inverse and SMTF(Show Me The Funny) have already taken place in different cities across the country.

Waves 2018
Tagline: Embrace The Shadows!

Waves 2018 featured events organised by the various clubs of Music, Dance, Literary, Quiz, Drama, Moot Court and the Fine Arts.  This edition of Waves attracted a footfall of over 50,000 with students from 150+ colleges taking part in the events. It was also the first edition of Waves in which a YouTube Conclave was held with YouTube celebrities like Meghna Kaur and YouTube channel Filter Copy sharing a stage.
The Pro Nites of Waves 2018 saw performances from Farhan Akhtar in the Bollywood Night and Quintino, one of the top 25 DJs in the world performed in the EDM night. The Indie Night saw a performance from music band Anand Bhaskar Collective.

Waves 2017 
A Tale In Two Shades!

Waves 2017 came with a new concept of celebrating the abstract. Photography events like ‘Montage’, ‘Mezzo-tint’, ‘Time Lapse’ and ‘Reverse flash’, ‘Waves Open Quiz’, ’Waves Debate Championship’, ‘Rubik’s Cube Challenge’,’Wallstreet Fete’ occurred. Other events like Searock, Show Me The Funny also showed continued growth from the last edition of Waves.
For the Bollywood night, vishal-shekhar ended the festival.

Sponsors and associations
Waves has attracted sponsorship associations from Coke Studio, LinkedIn, Cadbury, Britannia, TATA, ICICI Bank, Idea, Crompton Greaves, Reliance, Bharat Petroleum, Hero, Classmate, Redbull, Dell, LG, Reebok, AIRCEL, State Bank of India and Union Bank, T.I.M.E, Parle, Maruti Suzuki and ToneTag.

Waves has associations with some of the academics of the country for the variety of events. Including Indian Idol Academy, True School of Music(TSM), National Centre for Performing Arts (NCPA), Indian Mime academy, Jogesh Mime Academy, Thespo, NALSAR Bangalore, Indian Institute of Photography, Terrence Lewis Academy, Saroj Khan Dance Academy, Shiamak Dawar International Dance Academy, Indian B-Boying Federation, Indian Institute of Art and Design, Style Fiesta, Chalta Hai Comedy and Old Delhi Films.

References

External links
 

Culfests
Birla Institute of Technology and Science, Pilani